Alkanna is a genus of herbaceous plants including about 60 species of the family Boraginaceae.

Selected species

 A. amana Rech.f.
 A. angustifolia Sümbül
 A. areolata Boiss.
 A. attilae P.H.Davis
 A. aucheriana A.DC.
 A. auranitica Mouterde
 A. bracteosa Boiss.
 A. caliensis Heldr. ex Boiss.
 A. cappadocica Boiss. & Balansa
 A. confusa Sam. ex Rech.f.
 A. corcyrensis Hayek
 A. cordifolia K.Koch
 A. dumanii Sümbül
 A. frigida Boiss.
 A. froedinii Rech.f.
 A. galilaea Boiss.
 A. graeca Boiss. & Spruner
 A. haussknechtii Bornm.
 A. hirsutissima (Bertol.) A.DC.
 A. hispida Hub.-Mor.
 A. incana Boiss.
 A. jordanovii St.Kozhukharov
 A. kotschyana A.DC.
 A. leiocarpa Rech.f.
 A. leptophylla Rech.f.
 A. lutea A.DC.
 A. macrophylla Boiss. & Heldr.
 A. macrosiphon Boiss. & Heldr.
 A. maleolens Bornm.
 A. megacarpa A.DC.
 A. methanaea Hausskn.
 A. milliana Sümbül
 A. mughlae H.Duman, Güner& Cagban
 A. noneiformis Griseb.
 A. oreodaxo Hub.-Mor.
 A. orientalis (L.) Boiss.
 A. pamphylica Hub.-Mor. & Reese
 A. pelia (Halácsy) Rech.f.
 A. phrygia Bornm.
 A. pinardi Boiss.
 A. pindicola Hausskn.
 A. prasinophylla Rech.f.
 A. primuliflora Griseb.
 A. pseudotinctoria Hub.-Mor.
 A. pulmonaria Griseb.
 A. punctulata Hub.-Mor.
 A. sandwithii Rech.f.
 A. sartoriana Boiss. & Heldr.
 A. saxicola Hub.-Mor.
 A. scardica Griseb.
 A. shattuckia Post
 A. sieberi A.DC.
 A. sieheana Rech.f.
 A. stojanovii St.Kozhukharov
 A. stribrnyi Velen.
 A. strigosa Boiss. & Hohen.
 A. syriaca (Boiss. & Hohen.) Boiss.
 A. tinctoria (L.) Tausch
 A. trichophila Hub.-Mor.
 A. tubulosa Boiss.
 A. verecunda Hub.-Mor.
 A. viscidula Boiss.

 List sources : NOTE: Each species from the list at Tropicos.org was also checked against its corresponding entry at theplantlist.org for accepted status before being included on this page.

References

Boraginoideae
Boraginaceae genera